Candidate are an indie band from the United Kingdom, whose music has been described as folk rock, "full of gentle, dark soundscapes" and an "overflowing sink".

Members
 Joel Morris - vocals, acoustic guitar
 Alex Morris - electric and acoustic guitars, vocals
 Ian Painter - bass guitar, vocals, production

Brothers Joel and Alex Morris are the co-writers of The Framley Examiner website, and the book Bollocks to Alton Towers.

Discography

Albums
 Taking on the Enemy's Sound (2000)
 Tiger Flies (2002)
 Nuada (2002)
 Under the Skylon (2005)
 Oxengate (2007)

References

External links
 Official site
 Interview with Joel Morris about the Nuada project
 Positive Review of Under The Skylon at The Digital Fix

British indie rock groups